Taylor Larson (born April 28, 1988) is an American record producer, mixer, and audio engineer. He has produced, engineered, and/or mixed tracks for Asking Alexandria, Periphery, From First to Last, I See Stars, Veil of Maya, Within Temptation, The Dangerous Summer, Conditions, and Sky Eats Airplane. He is the guitarist of The Evening.

Selected discography

References

1988 births
Living people
American rock guitarists
Record producers from Maryland
American audio engineers
From First to Last members